Alene Paone is married to author, Frank Scoblete. She and Scoblete live in New York where she works as an adult reference librarian in a public library.  She is also a part-time swim teacher.  Scoblete often refers to Paone in his books, by the initials of "A.P."  After 13 years of marriage, Alene dropped the name Paone and took Scoblete as her surname.

Selected publications by Paone Press

 Frank Scoblete, Captain's Craps Revolution, 1993
 John F. Julian, Julian's No-Nonsense Guide to Winning Blackjack, 1992
 John F. Julian, The Julian Strategies in Roulette, 1992
 King Scobe, The Morons of Blackjack, 1992
 King Scobe, How to Break the One-Arm Bandit

Paone Press is also the publisher of Frank Scoblete's quarterly newsletter Chance and Circumstance.

References

 "Long Island Journal", The New York Times, January 16, 1994, section 13LI, page 3
 http://scoblete.casinocitytimes.com/article/find-the-loose-slots-on-the-tunica-loose-slot-tour-7387
 http://www.bjinsider.com/newsletter_81_acity.shtml
 http://loose-slots.com/

Living people
Year of birth missing (living people)
Businesspeople from New York City
American publishers (people)